Thomas Brown (born 9 August 1845, date of death unknown) was an English cricketer. He played nine first-class matches for Surrey between 1868 and 1874.

See also
 List of Surrey County Cricket Club players

References

External links
 

1845 births
Year of death missing
English cricketers
Surrey cricketers
People from Horsham District